The Camerons of Erracht were a minor noble Scottish family and a branch of the Clan Cameron, a Highland Scottish clan. In Scottish Gaelic they are known as the Sliochd Eòghain mhic Eòghain (the children of Ewen, son of Ewen).

History

Origins
The first representative of the Cameron of Erracht family was Ewen Cameron who was born in the late 15th century, son of Ewen Cameron, XIII of Lochiel, chief of Clan Cameron by his second wife Marjory Mackintosh, grand-daughter of Malcolm Beg Mackintosh, 10 chief of Clan Mackintosh. Ewen's son was John Dow M'Ewen V'Ewen Cameron, 2nd of Erracht who was executed in around 1585 for the murder of Donald Dubh Cameron, XV Chief of Clan Cameron, in 1569. John Bodach M'Iain V'Ewen Cameron, 3rd of Erracht was executed on the orders of Cameron of Lochiel in 1613.

Jacobite risings

Donald Cameron, 7th of Erracht was born shortly before the Jacobite rising of 1715. Thirty years later during the Jacobite rising of 1745 he joined Cameron of Lochiel and was second in command at the historic Glenfinnan gathering.

After the Jacobite defeat at the Battle of Culloden, Cameron of Erracht was a homeless warrior in the mountains for three years. He had three children, the eldest of whom was Sir Alan Cameron of Erracht K.C.B.

Sir Alan Cameron of Erracht

Sir Alan Cameron of Erracht raised the 79th or Cameron Highlanders in 1793. He was appointed Lieutenant-Colonel Commandant and led the regiment through the severe campaigns in Flanders from 1794 to 1795. In 1797 the regiment was broken up and two hundred and ten men joined the Black Watch regiment. In 1798 Cameron of Erracht raised a second 79th regiment that was seven hundred and eighty strong and after taking part in many engagements he died in 1828 in Fulham.

Captain Ludovick Cameron
Captain Ludovick Cameron (1866 - 1947) was a contributor to the sporting press and lived in Kent. Although he claimed to be the chieftain of Cameron of Erracht, he died without having been able to establish his claim.

Tartan

The Cameron of Erracht tartan was specially designed by Mrs Cameron of Erracht and is thought to have been based on an old Lochaber sett which itself had actually been based on old MacDonald overlordship.

See also
Clan Cameron
Chiefs of Clan Cameron

References

Erracht
Cameron of Erracht